Palmer Creek is a stream in Chariton County in the U.S. state of Missouri. It is a tributary of the Missouri River.

It continues to the south entering the Missouri River floodplain passing under US Route 24 approximately midway between Brunswick and Keytesville.

Palmer Creek was named after Maillard Palmer, the first state representative from Chariton County.

References

Rivers of Chariton County, Missouri
Rivers of Missouri